In symplectic topology and dynamical systems, Poincaré–Birkhoff theorem (also known as Poincaré–Birkhoff fixed point theorem and Poincaré's last geometric theorem) states that every area-preserving, orientation-preserving homeomorphism of an annulus that rotates the two boundaries in opposite directions has at least two fixed points.

History 
The Poincaré–Birkhoff theorem was discovered by Henri Poincaré, who published it in a 1912 paper titled "Sur un théorème de géométrie", and proved it for some special cases. The general case was proved by George D. Birkhoff in his 1913 paper titled "Proof of Poincaré's geometric theorem".

References

Further reading 
 M. Brown; W. D. Neumann. "Proof of the Poincaré-Birkhoff fixed-point theorem". Michigan Math. J. Vol.  24, 1977, p. 21–31.
 P. Le Calvez; J. Wang. "Some remarks on the Poincaré–Birkhoff theorem". Proc. Amer. Math. Soc. Vol. 138, No.2, 2010, p. 703–715.
 J. Franks. "Generalizations of the Poincaré-Birkhoff Theorem", Annals of Mathematics, Second Series, Vol. 128, No. 1 (Jul., 1988), pp. 139–151.

Symplectic topology
Dynamical systems
Fixed-point theorems